Collinsia parryi is a species of flowering plant in the plantain family known by the common name Parry's blue eyed Mary. It is endemic to central and southern California, where it is found in the southern Coast Ranges and in the Transverse Ranges north and east of Los Angeles.

This is an annual herb growing up to 40 centimeters tall with a spindly stem coated in fine hairs. The leaves are lance-shaped and may have dull teeth along the edges. Each flower is 4 to 10 millimeters long and is borne on a long pedicel.

The flower has lavender to purple, or occasionally white, lobes with minute hairs along the edges. The fruit is a capsule containing 8 to 12 seeds.

References

External links

Jepson Manual Treatment
Photo gallery

parryi
Endemic flora of California
Natural history of the California chaparral and woodlands
Natural history of the California Coast Ranges
Natural history of the Santa Monica Mountains
Natural history of the Transverse Ranges